Frederick William Mundee (May 20, 1913 – January 15, 1990) was an American football center who played three seasons with the Chicago Bears of the National Football League. He played college football at the University of Notre Dame and attended South High School in Youngstown, Ohio.

References

External links
Just Sports Stats

1913 births
1990 deaths
Players of American football from Youngstown, Ohio
American football centers
Notre Dame Fighting Irish football players
Chicago Bears players